The Kingsbury, trading as The Kingsbury PLC, formerly the Ceylon Continental Hotel Colombo and the Ceylon Inter-Continental Hotel, is a nine-story hotel located at 48, Janadhipathi Mawatha in the city centre of Colombo, Sri Lanka. It was built by U. N. Gunasekera, and is owned by Hotel Services (Ceylon) PLC, which is a subsidiary of Hayleys PLC. It was refurbished and reopened in January 2013.

History
Unlike the 1960s resort architecture, Ceylon InterContinental was an example of high rise engineering. A bomb exploded in nearby Central Bank of Sri Lanka building on 30 January 1996, killing at least 90 people. The hotel was damaged in the bombings.

It was one of the sites targeted during the 2019 Sri Lanka bombings that occurred on Easter Sunday.

See also
 Amaya Resorts & Spas, a hotel brand owned by Hayleys Group

References

1973 establishments in Sri Lanka
Hotels in Colombo
Hotel buildings completed in 1973
2019 Sri Lanka Easter bombings
Companies listed on the Colombo Stock Exchange